Victoria was a federal electoral district represented in the House of Commons of Canada from 1904 to 1968. It was located in the province of Ontario. This riding was first created in 1903 from parts of Peterborough East, Victoria North and Victoria South ridings.

It was initially defined as consisting of the county of Victoria, and the provisional county of Haliburton. In 1947, it was expanded to include the townships of Rama, Mara, Thorah and Brock in the county of Ontario.

The electoral district was abolished in 1966 when it became part of Victoria—Haliburton riding.

Members of Parliament

This riding elected the following members of the House of Commons of Canada:

Election history

|- 
  
|Liberal–Conservative
|Sam Hughes    
|align="right"| 4,085    
 
|Unknown
|R. J. McLaughlin 
|align="right"|3,782 
|}

|-
  
|Liberal–Conservative
|Sam Hughes  
|align="right"|4,315    
 
|Unknown
|Archibald Wilson  
|align="right"|3,277
|}

|-
  
|Liberal–Conservative
|Sam Hughes   
|align="right"| 4,001   
 
|Unknown
|James Burnett Begg  
|align="right"| 2,707 
|}

|-
  
|Liberal–Conservative
|Sam Hughes   
|align="right"|acclaimed   
|}

|-
  
|Government (Unionist)
|Sam Hughes    
|align="right"|6,338 
  
|Opposition (Laurier Liberals)
|George Dunkley Isaac   
|align="right"|3,079    
|}

|-
 
|Independent
|John Jabez Thurston   
|align="right"|8,019  
  
|Conservative
|Thomas Hubert Stinson 
|align="right"|7,816    
|}

|-
  
|Conservative
|Thomas Hubert Stinson
|align="right"|8,632 

|}

|-
  
|Conservative
|Thomas Hubert Stinson   
|align="right"|9,070 

|}

|-
  
|Conservative
|Thomas Hubert Stinson   
|align="right"| 8,999 
  
|Liberal
|Thomas John Carley  
|align="right"|  6,269
|}

|-
  
|Liberal
|Bruce McNevin  
|align="right"|8,234 
  
|Conservative
|Thomas Hubert Stinson  
|align="right"|8,174 

|}

|-
  
|Liberal
|Bruce McNevin 
|align="right"|  8,499

|National Government
|C. D. H. MacAlpine
|align="right"| 7,422 
|}

|-
  
|Progressive Conservative
|Clayton Hodgson  
|align="right"|   8,207 
  
|Liberal
|Bruce McNevin 
|align="right"|  7,388
 
|Co-operative Commonwealth
|Allan Wilson Botting 
|align="right"| 601  
|}

|-
  
|Progressive Conservative
|Clayton Hodgson  
|align="right"|  11,061 
  
|Liberal
|Bruce McNevin
|align="right"| 10,105 
 
|Co-operative Commonwealth
|Gordon Balfour Milling
|align="right"| 625   
|}

|-
  
|Progressive Conservative
|Clayton Hodgson  
|align="right"| 12,634 
  
|Liberal
|Foster M. Graham
|align="right"| 9,041   
|}

|-
  
|Progressive Conservative
|Clayton Hodgson  
|align="right"|14,153 
  
|Liberal
|Frank Welch 
|align="right"|  5,835 

 
|Co-operative Commonwealth
|George Albert Constable
|align="right"|860   
|}

|-
  
|Progressive Conservative
|Clayton Hodgson  
|align="right"|16,080 
  
|Liberal
|Joseph A. Hutton
|align="right"| 5,190
 
|Co-operative Commonwealth
|George Constable
|align="right"|1,112   
|}

|-
  
|Progressive Conservative
|Clayton Hodgson 
|align="right"|12,555 
  
|Liberal
|Frank Welch 
|align="right"| 6,653 
 
|New Democratic
|Allan Gordon McPhail 
|align="right"| 3,029

|}

|-
  
|Progressive Conservative
|Charles Lamb
|align="right"| 10,538 
  
|Liberal
|S. Clifton Benson 
|align="right"| 9,572 
 
|New Democratic
|Allan Gordon McPhail
|align="right"| 2,994   
|}

|-
  
|Progressive Conservative
|William C. Scott 
|align="right"| 11,282
  
|Liberal
|Hugh David Petrie Logan
|align="right"| 8,828 
 
|New Democratic
|Allan Gordon McPhail
|align="right"|  3,230    
|}

See also 

 List of Canadian federal electoral districts
 Past Canadian electoral districts
 Monarchy in Ontario

External links 

 Website of the Parliament of Canada

Former federal electoral districts of Ontario